The Pesticides Safety Directorate was an agency of the Department for Environment, Food and Rural Affairs (Defra). It was based in York, England, with about 200 scientific, policy and support staff and was responsible for the authorisation of plant protection products and, from 2005, detergents, in the United Kingdom.

In April 2008, it joined the Health and Safety Executive (HSE), and in April 2009, became part of a newly formed Chemicals Regulation Directorate (CRD) at the HSE.

Aims of the Pesticides Safety Directorate
To ensure the safe use of pesticides and detergents for people and the environment.
To harmonise pesticide regulation within the European Community and provide a level playing field for crop protection.
As part of the strategy for sustainable food and farming, to reduce negative impacts of pesticides on the environment.

References

 (sourced from the Wayback Machine.)

External links
 Home page of the Pesticides Safety Directorate official website as preserved by The National Archives on 19 September 2006.
 Stewardship Community - working together to promote the safe, effective use of pesticides

Agricultural organisations based in the United Kingdom
Defunct executive agencies of the United Kingdom government
Organisations based in York
Garden pests
Pesticides in the United Kingdom
Research institutes in North Yorkshire
Pesticide regulation